The National League for Liberty in Vaccination is a French anti-vaccine advocacy organization which opposes all government vaccine requirements. It was formed in 1954 to oppose tuberculosis vaccines. The organization denies the benefits of vaccinations while promoting misinformation about their dangers.

History 
The LNPLV refers to a tradition from the end of the 19th century, "the Universal League of Antivaccinators" (or "the International League of Antivaccinators" founded by the Belgian ophthalmologist, Dr Hubert Boëns (1825-1898) in 1880), which represented a scholarly "anti-vaccinism" bringing together only doctors and personalities, holding international congresses (Cologne 1881, Charleroi 1885). The action of this current aimed to postpone the obligation of vaccination against smallpox in France (Liouville 1880 bill) until the vote of the law of 1902.  

Under the title of National League against the obligation of vaccinations, the association was founded in 1954, by a merger of three groups opposed to the vaccination obligation extended to BCG in 1950:  

Association of Parents of Vaccination Victims;  

The founder is Marcel Lemaire, father and non-doctor, who refused BCG for his child in 1952, and who was fined.

The magazine of the association then bore the title Vaccination or Health until 1966, to become Health, freedom and vaccinations.

References

Bibliography 
 .

External links
French web site for the Ligue nationale pour la liberté des vaccinations

Anti-vaccination organizations
Medical and health organizations based in France